Jahangir Amouzegar (January 13, 1920 – January 17, 2018) was an Iranian economist, academic and politician.
An economist by training, Amuzegar served as Minister of Commerce and Minister of Finance of Iran from 26 May 1962 until 19 July 1962. He also acted as an executive director of the International Monetary Fund. Amouzegar held a bachelor's degree in economy from Tehran University. He pursued his studies and eventually got a doctorate from UCLA.

His brother, Jamshid Amuzegar, was a Prime Minister of Iran during the Shah's reign.

He died on 17 January 2018 in the United States, 4 days after his 98th birthday.

Books
Managing the Oil Wealth: Opec's Windfalls and Pitfalls. .
The Dynamics of the Iranian Revolution: The Pahlavis' Triumph and Tragedy. .

Notes

1920 births
2018 deaths
Finance ministers of Iran
International Monetary Fund people
20th-century Iranian economists
Writers from Tehran
Politicians from Tehran
University of California, Los Angeles alumni
University of Tehran alumni
Iranian officials of the United Nations
Iranian emigrants to the United States
20th-century Iranian politicians